This is a list of sovereign states in the 1950s, giving an overview of states around the world during the period between 1 January 1950 and 31 December 1959. It contains 108 entries, arranged alphabetically, with information on the status and recognition of their sovereignty. It includes 102 widely recognized sovereign states, 5 entities which were de facto sovereign but which were not widely recognized by other states, and 1 state which was initially unrecognized but then gained full recognition later in the decade.

Sovereign states

Other entities
Excluded from the list above are the following noteworthy entities which either were not fully sovereign or did not claim to be independent:
  Estonia was incorporated into the Soviet Union in 1940, but the legality of the annexation was not widely recognized. The Baltic diplomatic services in the West continued to be recognised as representing the de jure state.
  Latvia was incorporated into the Soviet Union in 1940, but the legality of the annexation was not widely recognized. The Baltic diplomatic services in the West continued to be recognised as representing the de jure state.
  Lithuania was incorporated into the Soviet Union in 1940, but the legality of the annexation was not widely recognized. The Baltic diplomatic services in the West continued to be recognised as representing the de jure state.
 The Saudi–Iraqi neutral zone was a strip of neutral territory between Iraq and Saudi Arabia.
 The Saudi–Kuwaiti neutral zone was a strip of neutral territory between Kuwait and Saudi Arabia.
  The Sovereign Military Order of Malta was an entity claiming sovereignty. The order had bi-lateral diplomatic relations with a large number of states, but had no territory other than extraterritorial areas within Rome. Although the order frequently asserted its sovereignty, it did not claim to be a sovereign state. It lacked a defined territory. Since all its members were citizens of other states, almost all of them lived in their native countries, and those who resided in the order's extraterritorial properties in Rome did so only in connection with their official duties, the order lacked the characteristic of having a permanent population.
  Tangier was an international zone under the joint administration of France, Spain, the United Kingdom, Italy, Portugal and Belgium. It was reintegrated into Morocco on 29 October 1956.
  →  West Berlin was a political enclave that was closely aligned with – but not actually a part of – West Germany. It consisted of three occupied sectors administered by the United States, the United Kingdom, and France.

See also
List of sovereign states by year
List of state leaders in 1950
List of state leaders in 1951
List of state leaders in 1952
List of state leaders in 1953
List of state leaders in 1954
List of state leaders in 1955
List of state leaders in 1956
List of state leaders in 1957
List of state leaders in 1958
List of state leaders in 1959

Notes

References

1950-1959
1950s politics-related lists
1950 in international relations
1951 in international relations
1952 in international relations
1953 in international relations
1954 in international relations
1955 in international relations
1956 in international relations
1957 in international relations
1958 in international relations
1959 in international relations